Nicole Pani (born Montandon on 30 October 1948 at Suresnes) is a former French athlete, who specialised in sprinting.

Biography  
Pani became notable in the 1966 junior track where she ran 11.8s in the 100 m. and 24.3s in the 200 m. She won second place at the European Championships in the category over 200m. She married the long jumper, Jack Pani.

She participated in the 1968 Olympics, at Mexico and placed fifth in the 200m (23.0s).

Selected 29 times for French athletic teams, she won the silver medal in the 100m during the 1971 Mediterranean Games.  In 1972 she was second in the 4 × 1 lap relay in the European Indoor Championships at Grenoble, in the company of Michèle Beugnet,  Claudine Meire and Christiane Marlet.

She titled in the 200m during the 1968 French Athletics Championships, and established multiple French national records in the 200m,  the 4 × 100m and the 4 × 200 m.

prize list

Records

notes and references

External links  
 Olympic profile for Nicole Pani at sports-reference.com

Sources 
 DocAthlé 2003, French Athletics Federation, p. 421   
 (*) The Athletics Equipe Magazine No. 32 of 28 September 1971   Robert Pariente sheet.

Living people
1948 births
French female sprinters
Olympic athletes of France
Athletes (track and field) at the 1968 Summer Olympics
Mediterranean Games gold medalists for France
Mediterranean Games silver medalists for France
Athletes (track and field) at the 1971 Mediterranean Games
Athletes (track and field) at the 1975 Mediterranean Games
Mediterranean Games medalists in athletics